Renschler is a surname. Notable people with the surname include:

Andreas Renschler (born 1958), German engineer
Beate Renschler (born 1958), German gymnast
Hans Renschler (1925–2011), German scientist
Helmut Renschler, German military veteran

See also
Rentschler